The Botai culture is an archaeological culture (c. 3700–3100 BC) of prehistoric northern Central Asia. It was named after the settlement of Botai in today's northern Kazakhstan. The Botai culture has two other large sites: Krasnyi Yar, and Vasilkovka.

The Botai site is on the Imanburlyq, a tributary of the Ishim. The site has at least 153 pit-houses. The settlement was partly destroyed by river erosion, which is still occurring, and by management of the wooded area.

Archaeology

The Botai culture emerged with the transition from a nomadic hunter-gatherer lifestyle with a variety of game to a sedentary lifestyle with a diet that heavily relied on horse meat. 
The settlements of the Botai consisted of pit-houses and were relatively large and permanent, the largest being the type site at Botai with over 160 houses. The population of the Botai culture has been connected to the earliest evidence for horse husbandry. Enormous amounts of horse bones were found in and around the Botai settlements, suggesting that the Botai people kept horses or even domesticated them. Archaeological data suggests that the Botai were sedentary pastoralists and also domesticated dogs.

A number of researchers state that horses were domesticated locally by the Botai. It was once thought that most of the horses in evidence were probably the wild species, Equus ferus, hunted with bows, arrows, and spears. However, evidence reported in 2009 for pottery containing mare's milk and of horse bones with telltale signs of being bred after domestication have demonstrated a much stronger case for the Botai culture as a major user of domestic horses by about 3,500 BC, close to 1,000 years earlier than the previous scientific consensus. Botai horses were primarily ancestors of Przewalski's horses, and contributed 2.7% ancestry to modern domestic horses. Thus, modern horses may have been domesticated in other centers of origin.

However, more recent studies analyzing dental calculus suggest an absence of dairy product consumption among Botai culture individuals, which would potentially discard the previously believed milking of the horses assumed from the presence of animal fats on pottery.

Damgaard et al. (2018) confirmed that the Botai horses were not the ancestors of the common modern horse Equus caballus but were nonetheless domesticated - of particular interest is the "genetic domestication selection at the horse TRPM1 coat-color locus" as per the study.

Although contemporaneous to Copper Age and Early Bronze Age metal-working cultures in other parts of the Eurasian steppe, there is no evidence for metallurgy in Botai settlements. Tools were produced from stone and horse bones, with a shift in stone tool production from the microliths of the preceding nomadic hunter cultures to larger bifaces. The pottery of the culture had simple shapes, most examples being gray in color and unglazed. The decorations are geometric, including hatched triangles and rhombi as well as step motifs. Punctates and circles were also used as decorative motifs.

Language reconstruction
Asko Parpola suggests that the language of the Botai culture cannot be conclusively identified with any known language or language family. He suggests that the Proto-Ugric word *lox for "horse" is a borrowing from the language of the Botai culture. However, Vladimir Napolskikh believes that it comes from Proto-Tocharian *l(ə)wa ("prey; livestock").

Václav Blažek suggests that the Botai people probably spoke a form of Yeniseian languages. Linguistic data lends some support for a homeland of Yeniseian within the Central Asian Steppe, prior to its migration into Siberia. This Yeniseian/Botai language contributed some loanwords related to horsemanship and pastoralism, such as the word for horse (Yeniseian *ʔɨʔχ-kuʔs "stallion" and Indo-European *H₁ek̂wos "domesticated horse") itself, towards proto-Indo-European.

Archaeogenetics
Damgaard et al. (2018) and Jeong et al. (2019) extracted aDNA from five different Botai individuals. Four of them turned out to be male, and another one was female. Two of the samples were taken from crania curated in Petropavlovsk Museum, denoted as "Botai Excavation 14, 1983" and "Botai excavation 15".

Autosomally, the Botai population derived most of their ancestry from a deeply European-related population known as Ancient North Eurasians (short ANE), while also displaying some "Ancient East Asian" (AEA) admixture. A model by Damgaard et al. suggests that the ANE-related ancestry of the Botai people and the Eastern European Hunter-Gatherers (EHG), who contributed around half of the gene pool of the people of Yamnaya culture, diverged about 15,000 years ago, while the admixture event between ANE-related ancestry and AEA-related ancestry was estimated to about 7,000 years ago. The Botai samples could be modeled as approximately ≈75% ANE (West Eurasian) and ≈25% AEA (East Asian). The East Asian component has been introduced into the region through geneflow from Eastern Siberia.

Botai 14, dated to 3517-3108 cal BC, carried a derived allele at R1b1a1-M478, that occurs almost exclusively among Indo-European derived populations surrounding the Altai region. Botai 15, dated to 3343-3026 cal BC, belonged to a branch of the haplogroup N-M231 (N2a-P189.2* according to YFull). Regarding mitochondrial DNA, the Copper Age Botai sample BOT2016 belonged to the haplogroup Z1a, Botai 15 - to R1b1, and Botai 14 - to K1b2.

Two more Botai individuals were tested in September 2015. One sample belonged to the mitochondrial DNA haplogroup K1b2 and the paternal Haplogroup O-M268 (with the 97.1% probability).

Footnote

References

Bibliography

External links
 

Archaeological cultures of Central Asia
Archaeological cultures of Northern Asia
Archaeology of Kazakhstan
Archaeology of Siberia
4th-millennium BC establishments